Stay where you are may also reter to:

a track of Call the Doctor by Sleater-Kinney
a part of announcement during the Sinking of MV Sewol
a silent march campaign in South Korea, first proposed by Yong Hyein that originated in announcement